Nathaniel Pitcher Tallmadge (February 8, 1795November 2, 1864) was an American lawyer and politician.  He served two terms as United States Senator from New York (1833–1844) and was the 3rd Governor of the Wisconsin Territory (1844–1845).

Early life
Tallmadge was born in Chatham, New York, on February 8, 1795, the son of Joel Tallmadge (1756–1834) and Phoebe ( Potter; 1779–1842).  Joel Tallmadge was a veteran of the American Revolution and a blacksmith before attaining success as a farmer and lumber merchant at his home on Tallmadge Hill in Barton, New York.  Nathaniel Tallmadge attended Williams College before transferring to Union College, from which he graduated in 1815.  He then moved to Poughkeepsie to study law with his first cousin, James Tallmadge, Jr.  He attained admission to the bar in 1818, and entered into a legal practice in partnership with his cousin, James.  The partnership continued until James Tallmadge's election as Lieutenant Governor of New York in 1825, after which Nathaniel Tallmadge continued to practice on his own.

Career
Tallmadge became active in politics as a Jacksonian.  He was a member of the New York State Assembly (Dutchess Co.) in 1828, and he served in the New York State Senate (2nd D.) from 1830 to 1833, sitting in the 53rd, 54th, 55th and 56th New York State Legislatures.

United States Senator
In 1833, he was elected as a Jacksonian Democrat to the United States Senate for the term beginning on March 4, 1833. In 1838, he was a member of the "Conservatives," a faction of former Democrats unhappy with the policies of Andrew Jackson's successor, Martin Van Buren and Van Buren's grip on New York politics as head of the Albany Regency political machine.  The conservatives endorsed the Whig candidates for Governor and Lieutenant Governor, William H. Seward and Luther Bradish, who were narrowly elected over incumbents William L. Marcy and John Tracy.  The defection of the conservatives was considered a harbinger for the 1840 presidential election, at which Van Buren was defeated by William Henry Harrison.

By the time of New York's 1839 election for U.S. Senator, Tallmadge had become identified with the Whigs, who nominated him for reelection.  Democrats controlled the State Senate, and they objected to Tallmadge because of his decision to abandon Van Buren.  By refusing to vote, the Democrats in the State Senate prevented any candidate from obtaining a majority.  As a result of the legislature's failure to make a choice, Tallmadge's seat became vacant on March 4, 1839.  By 1840, the Whigs controlled both houses of the legislature.  On January 13, 1840, they reelected Tallmadge to the Senate, and indicated in their approved resolutions that the effective date was as of March 4, 1839.  He took his seat on January 27, 1840, and served until June 17, 1844, when he resigned to accept appointment as a territorial governor.

In 1840, Tallmadge was offered the Whig nomination for vice president.  He declined, and John Tyler was nominated and elected on the Whig ticket with Harrison.  According to published accounts in 1841, Tallmadge also declined a cabinet post and an ambassadorship, because he preferred to remain in the Senate.

Governor of Wisconsin Territory
In the early 1840s, Tallmadge purchased a large tract of land in what became Fond du Lac, Wisconsin, in anticipation of constructing a home for his retirement.  In 1844, John Tyler, who had become president following Harrison's death, offered Tallmadge the governorship of Wisconsin Territory.  He accepted, and moved to Fond du Lac.  The Senate confirmed the appointment in June, and Tallmadge arrived in Wisconsin in August.  James Duane Doty, who had been governor since 1841, had a contentious relationship with the territorial legislature.  Although legislators were initially suspicious of Tallmadge, who had not lived in Wisconsin prior to his appointment, he won them over by taking a conciliatory approach in his initial message.  Promising not to take an overly partisan approach, he advocated for the expansion of railroads, in keeping with the position he had taken as a state legislator and a U.S. Senator.  He also argued against extending the naturalization period for Wisconsin citizenship to 21 years, and promoted experimental farms and agricultural societies.  The legislature authorized printing and distribution of his message, including 750 copies in German, the first time Wisconsin legislators had ever taken such an action.

The 1844 presidential election was won by Democrat James K. Polk.  In April 1845, Polk nominated Henry Dodge to serve as territorial governor.  Dodge, who had also been Wisconsin Territory's first governor, was easily confirmed by the U.S. Senate, and assumed his new post on April 8, 1845.

Later years
Tallmadge decided to stay in Wisconsin, and built his planned residence in Fond du Lac, where he practiced law while living in semi-retirement.  He also maintained a home in Washington, D.C., where he frequently traveled to serve as an unofficial ambassador for Wisconsin to the federal government and lobbyist for its interests.

Later in his life Tallmadge became a spiritualist, and was convinced of the existence of the afterlife.  He had previously been a believer in premonitions, and claimed he had one that resulted in him narrowly escaped death aboard the USS Princeton when a cannon exploded and took the lives of five people.  In the 1840s, he began to claim that he was visited by spirits, and he authored introduction to Charles Linton's The Healing of the Nations, a book which Linton claimed had been dictated to him by ghosts.  He also wrote an Appendix to the first volume of Spiritualism by John W. Edmonds and George T. Dexter.  After the death of John C. Calhoun, Tallmadge claimed to be visited by his spirit, and said that it could communicate with him.  Tallmadge was also reported to be a believer in other supposed spirit communications, including the floor and table rappings that typically accompanied séances.

Personal life
In 1824, Tallmadge was married to Abigail Lewis Smith (1804–1857), the daughter of Judge Isaac Smith of Washington, New York.  In 1864, he married Clementine Ring. Tallmadge's children were:

 Isaac Smith Tallmadge (b. 1824), who became a member of the Wisconsin State Assembly.
 William Davis Tallmadge (1826–1845), who died soon after his graduation from Union College.
 Grier Tallmadge (1827–1862), a United States Military Academy graduate and captain in the United States Army.  He died at Fort Monroe during the American Civil War.
 Louisa Tallmadge (1829–1830), who died young.
 Mary Louisa Tallmadge (1831–1893), the wife of first Napoleon Boardman of Wisconsin, and second William Baldwin of Philadelphia.
 Laura Tallmadge (1833–1889), the wife of Dr. William T. Galloway of Eau Claire, Wisconsin.
 John James Tallmadge (1835–1897), the postmaster of Peebles, Wisconsin, and the Peebles agent for the Sheboygan and Fond du Lac Railroad
 Julia Tallmadge (1835–1919), the wife of bank president Augustus G. Ruggles of Fond du Lac.
 Emily Bartlett Tallmadge (1840–1900), the wife of James D. Tallmadge of Chicago.

In his later years, Tallmadge resided in Harmonia, a planned community for spiritualists in Battle Creek, Michigan.  He died in Battle Creek on November 2, 1864, and was buried at Rienzi Cemetery in Fond du Lac.

The first person to be buried at Rienzi Cemetery was Tallmadge's son William, who died in 1845.  In 1853, Tallmadge donated eight and a half acres from his home to be used in creating the cemetery.  Its trustees subsequently purchased 24 additional acres, which it used for a planned expansion.

His first cousin, James Tallmadge, Jr., was a United States Congressman from New York (1817–1819), Lieutenant Governor of New York (1825–1826), and first President of New York University from its founding (which James had helped with) in 1831 until 1850. James's sister, another first cousin of Nathaniel, was Rebecca Tallmadge, who married Theodorus Bailey, a United States Congressman and United States Senator from New York, as well as postmaster of New York City. His first cousin, once removed was Benjamin Tallmadge, United States Congressman from Connecticut. Through the Tallmadge family, Nathaniel is a distant cousin of Ernest Hemingway and Ben Affleck.

Descendants
Through his daughter Mary Louisa Tallmadge (wife of Napoleon Boardman), he was a grandfather of Charles Ruggles Boardman, an adjutant general of Wisconsin.

References

Sources

Books

Magazines

Internet

Notes
His middle name is Potter. This was his mother's maiden name, Rhoba Potter Tallmadge.

External links

1795 births
1864 deaths
People from Chatham, New York
American people of English descent 
American spiritualists
Jacksonian United States senators from New York (state)
Democratic Party United States senators from New York (state)
Whig Party United States senators from New York (state)
Wisconsin Whigs
Governors of Wisconsin Territory
Members of the New York State Assembly
New York (state) state senators
Politicians from Fond du Lac, Wisconsin
Politicians from Poughkeepsie, New York
Writers from Poughkeepsie, New York
Writers from Wisconsin
Union College (New York) alumni
Burials in Wisconsin